Murphy City is an unincorporated community in Stony River Township, Lake County, Minnesota, United States; located within the Finland State Forest.

The community is located 19 miles north of Silver Bay at the intersection of Minnesota State Highway 1 and Hart Street.

Murphy City is located within the southeast corner of Stony River Township.

References

Unincorporated communities in Minnesota
Unincorporated communities in Lake County, Minnesota